Na Thawi District Stadium is a multi-purpose stadium in Na Thawi, Songkhla province, Thailand.  It is currently mainly used for football matches and is the home stadium of Songkhla United F.C.  The stadium holds 3,000 people.

Football venues in Thailand
Multi-purpose stadiums in Thailand
Buildings and structures in Songkhla province
Sport in Songkhla province